Theodoor Gerard van Lidth de Jeude (8 July 1788 in Tiel – 23 December 1863 in Utrecht) was a Dutch physician, veterinarian, and zoologist and was the first director of the newly established Rijks Veterinary College where Veterinary medicine was first taught in the Netherlands in late 1821. His primary contribution to science was the collecting of specimens.

Life and career
Theodoor Gerard was born as the son of a mayor, Cornelis Philip van Lidth de Jeude (born 11 April 1744 in Tiel; died 27 February 1830 in Tiel) and his wife Anna Margaretha van Ee (born 12 February 1750 in Utrecht; died 28 May 1832 in Tiel). He studied philosophy and medicine at the Universities of Utrecht and Leiden from 1806. Subsequently, he worked as a physician at a hospital in Utrecht. In 1815, he became Professor of Anatomy and Physiology at the Athaneum in Harderwijk. In 1819, he became adjunct professor of animal science at the Utrecht University.

In 1820, he became professor of veterinary medicine and director of the Veterinary School in Utrecht, where he started in 1821 and taught until 1851. He was also a professor of zoology and became Rector of his alma mater in 1833/34. Lidt de Jeude retired in October 1858 and died five years later.

References

Further reading
W. C. Schimmel: LIDTH DE JEUDE (Theodoor Gerard van). In: Nieuw Nederlandsch Biografisch Woordenboek, Deel 1. Herausgegeben von Petrus Johannes Blok und Philipp Christiaan Molhuysen, Leiden 1911, p. 1274 (online at the Instituut voor Nederlandse Geschiedenis oder der Digitale Bibliotheek voor de Nederlandse Letteren).
P. Smit, L. Terken: Naturae et Artibus, een Zoölogische Sociëteit in Utrecht. De relatie met Natura Artis Magistrat e Amsterdam. In: Jaarboek Oud-Utrecht. 1998, p. 98 ff.

1788 births
1863 deaths
Dutch herpetologists
Dutch zoologists
Male veterinarians
People from Tiel
Rectors of universities in the Netherlands
Utrecht University alumni
Academic staff of Utrecht University
Dutch veterinarians